Agathotoma subtilis is a species of sea snail, a marine gastropod mollusk in the family Mangeliidae.

Description
The length of the shell attains 7.8 mm.

Distribution
This marine species occurs in the Atlantic Ocean of Pernambuco, Brazil.

References

 Watson. Jour. Linn. Soc., xv, p. 431, 1881

External links
  Tucker, J.K. 2004 Catalog of recent and fossil turrids (Mollusca: Gastropoda). Zootaxa 682:1-1295.

subtilis
Gastropods described in 1881